The 1966 Cleveland Indians season was a season in American baseball. The team finished fifth in the American League with a record of 81–81, 17 games behind the Baltimore Orioles.

Offseason 
Vernon Stouffer bought 80% of the Cleveland Indians for $8,000,000.
November 28, 1965: Hank Peters resigned from the Kansas City Athletics and became the minor league director for the Cleveland Indians.

Notable transactions 
 November 29, 1965: Al Closter was selected by the Indians from the New York Yankees in the first-year player draft.
 November 29, 1965: Al Luplow was purchased from the Indians by the New York Mets.
 December 1, 1965: Joe Rudi and Phil Roof were traded by the Indians to the Kansas City Athletics for Jim Landis and Jim Rittwage.
 January 14, 1966: Lou Clinton was traded by the Indians to the New York Yankees for Doc Edwards.
 March 10, 1966: Cam Carreon was traded by the Indians to the Baltimore Orioles for Lou Piniella.

Regular season 
On May 1, Sam McDowell threw his second consecutive one-hitter for the Indians.
On May 8, 1966, Baltimore Orioles outfielder Frank Robinson hit a 540-foot home run off Indians pitcher Luis Tiant, becoming the only player to hit a fair ball out of Memorial Stadium.

Season standings

Record vs. opponents

Notable transactions 
 April 6, 1966: Ralph Terry was traded by the Indians to the Kansas City Athletics for John O'Donoghue and cash.

Opening Day Lineup

Roster

Player stats

Batting

Starters by position 
Note: Pos = Position; G = Games played; AB = At bats; H = Hits; Avg. = Batting average; HR = Home runs; RBI = Runs batted in

Other batters 
Note: G = Games played; AB = At bats; H = Hits; Avg. = Batting average; HR = Home runs; RBI = Runs batted in

Pitching

Starting pitchers 
Note: G = Games pitched; IP = Innings pitched; W = Wins; L = Losses; ERA = Earned run average; SO = Strikeouts

Other pitchers 
Note: G = Games pitched; IP = Innings pitched; W = Wins; L = Losses; ERA = Earned run average; SO = Strikeouts

Relief pitchers 
Note: G = Games pitched; W = Wins; L = Losses; SV = Saves; ERA = Earned run average; SO = Strikeouts

Farm system

Notes

References 
1966 Cleveland Indians season at Baseball Reference

Cleveland Guardians seasons
Cleveland Indians season
Cleveland